Pedro Cachín and Facundo Mena were the defending champions but chose not to defend their title.

Alexander Erler and Lucas Miedler won the title after defeating Karol Drzewiecki and Patrik Niklas-Salminen 7–6(7–3), 6–1 in the final.

Seeds

Draw

References

External links
 Main draw

Tampere Open - Doubles
2022 Doubles